Tengku Amir Nasser Ibrahim Ibni Almarhum Tengku Arif Bendahara Ibrahim (born on 25 August 1986) is a member of Pahang Royal Family. He is the adopted son of Al-Sultan Abdullah Ri'ayatuddin Al-Mustafa Billah Shah, the current Sultan of Pahang and his wife, Tunku Azizah Aminah Maimunah Iskandariah.

Background
Tengku Amir Nasser Ibrahim was born on 25 August 1986. He is the youngest of ten children of the late Tengku Arif Bendahara Ibrahim Ibni Sultan Abu Bakar. Tengku Amir is also his father's youngest son from his third wife, Czarina binti Abdullah. Tengku Amir has an elder full brother, Tengku Arif Fahad, born on 12 September 1984 and an elder full sister, Tengku Chanela Jamidah, born on 20 May 1983.

Tengku Amir is the grandson of Sultan Abu Bakar Ri’ayatuddin Al-Mu’azzam Shah Ibni Al-Marhum Sultan Abdullah Al-Mu’tassim Billah Shah, the fourth Sultan of modern Pahang.

In 1987, at the age of one, he was adopted by his cousin, the Tengku Mahkota of Pahang at that time, Tengku Abdullah Sultan Ahmad Shah to be his adopted son. He was raised along with Tengku Abdullah's children, namely Tengku Hassanal Ibrahim Alam Shah, the current Tengku Mahkota of Pahang.

Military career
Tengku Amir Nasser Ibrahim had undergone military training at the Royal Military Academy Sandhurst, United Kingdom.
On 21 January 2020, he was promoted to Lieutenant Colonel and two years later, on 7 April 2022, he was promoted again to Colonel. He currently serves as Commander of Regiment 505 of the Territorial Army.

Marriage
Tengku Amir Nasser Ibrahim married Yang Hormat Mulia Cik Puan Panglima Puteri Suraiya Afzan Binti Mohamed Moiz on 19 December 2013. Puteri Suraiya Afzan is the daughter of Yang Amat Mulia Tengku Puteri Seri Lela Manja Pahang Tengku Dato' Hajah Nong Fatimah binti Almarhum Sultan Haji Ahmad Shah who is Tengku Amir's first cousin.

Tengku Amir Nasser Ibrahim and his wife have three sons; Tengku Adam Ibrahim Shah (born on 27 December 2015), Tengku Sulaiman Abdullah Shah (born on 25 June 2018) and Tengku Nuh Muhammad Shah (born on 31 January 2022).

Tengku Panglima Raja
On 18 August 2019, upon the accession of his adoptive father as Sultan of Pahang, Tengku Amir Nasser Ibrahim was conferred the title Tengku Panglima Raja.

In his capacity as Tengku Panglima Raja, Tengku Amir Nasser Ibrahim also serves as Deputy President of the State Islamic Religious and Malay Customs Council (MUIP).

Honours
  :
  Grand Knight of the Order of the Crown of Pahang (SIMP) — Dato' Indera (2016)
  Grand Knight of the Order of Sultan Ahmad Shah of Pahang (SSAP) — Dato' Sri (2020)

References

1986 births
Living people
Royal House of Pahang
People from Pahang
Malaysian Muslims